Márcio José de Oliveira (born July 20, 1984 in Irapuã), or simply Marcinho, is a Brazilian attacking midfielder.

Career
Marcinho began his career with Cruzeiro, by which team won many titles, as a reserve team. Then in 2005, transferred to the Grêmio, where quickly followed for Gençlerbirliği, Turkey.

He returned to Brazil in 2006, wearing the shirt of Atlético Mineiro. He helped the Roosters in his return to the First Division, having been one of the highlights of that campaign.
In 2008, Marcinho arrived in Flamengo, however, soon took the title by virtue of having become the top scorer of the team. Living your best phase in his career, Marcinho left Flamengo, during the playing of the Brazilian Championship, to go play on Al-Jazira Club.

However, undoing his hit with Al-Jazira Club, preferring Marcinho just signed with Qatar S.C.

Flamengo career statistics
(Correct  July 16, 2009)

according to combined sources on the official website.

Honours
 Cruzeiro
Minas Gerais State League: 2003, 2004
Brazilian Cup: 2003
Brazilian National Championship Série A: 2003
 Atlético Mineiro
Brazilian National Championship Série B: 2006
Minas Gerais State League: 2007
 Flamengo
Taça Guanabara: 2008
Rio de Janeiro State League: 2008
 Vasco da Gama
Rio de Janeiro State League: 2015

References

External links
 
placar 
CBF  
Guardian Stats Centre
QSL

1984 births
Living people
Brazilian footballers
Brazilian expatriate footballers
Cruzeiro Esporte Clube players
Grêmio Foot-Ball Porto Alegrense players
Gençlerbirliği S.K. footballers
Clube Atlético Mineiro players
Ipatinga Futebol Clube players
CR Flamengo footballers
Qatar SC players
Esporte Clube Vitória players
CR Vasco da Gama players
Brazilian expatriate sportspeople in Turkey
Expatriate footballers in Turkey
Expatriate footballers in Qatar
Campeonato Brasileiro Série A players
Süper Lig players
Qatar Stars League players
Association football midfielders